Channel 22 may refer to:

 XEIMT-TDT, aka Canal 22, a Mexican cultural and educational television station
 Mix 22, a channel on XM Satellite Radio

Canada
The following television stations operate on virtual channel 22 in Canada:
 CIII-DT-22 in Stevenson, Ontario
 CIVB-DT in Rimouski, Quebec

See also
 "Twenty Two" (The Twilight Zone), an episode of the American television series The Twilight Zone
 Channel 22 virtual TV stations in the United States
For UHF frequencies covering 518-524 MHz
 Channel 22 TV stations in Canada
 Channel 22 TV stations in Mexico
 Channel 22 digital TV stations in the United States
 Channel 22 low-power TV stations in the United States

22